Iron Youth is O-Shen's debut album, released in 2000.

Track listing
Honolulu - 5:00
Pacifican Herbsman - 3:58
Pretty Wahine - 3:56
Island Warriors - 3:43
Wat'cha Gonna Do - 4:18
Girl - 4:15
Nation of Confusion - 5:02
Meri Lewa - 3:56
Melanesia - 3:30
Planet Earth - 5:12

References

2000 albums
O-Shen albums
Na Hoku Hanohano Award-winning albums